Ural was an auxiliary cruiser of the Imperial Russian Navy during the Russo-Japanese War. She was renamed Kaiserin Maria Theresia in 1899, before being sold to the Russians in 1904.

Commercial service
She had two funnels, three masts, and a single screw, with accommodation for 244 first-class, 122 second-class and 460 third-class passengers. She made her maiden voyage leaving Bremen for New York on 11 October 1890. She would continue to ply this route for eight years.

Whilst heading west across the Atlantic in November 1892, Sprees main propeller shaft broke and made a hole in the stern. There was considerable panic amongst the passengers until it became clear that the ship's watertight compartments would keep it afloat. Two days later, the steamship Lake Huron was sighted and was able to tow Spree back to Ireland. There was only one casualty in the incident: a man who threw himself overboard and was drowned. The event was memorialized in a poem by William McGonagall.

In 1899 she was completely rebuilt by AG Vulcan. The number of funnels was increased to three, though she was reduced to two masts. Her accommodation was altered to carry 405 first-class, 114 second-class and 387 third-class passengers, and she was renamed Kaiserin Maria Theresia (some sources say Theresa.)

Wartime service
She was sold to the Imperial Russian Navy in 1904 for use in the Russo-Japanese War. The Russians rebuilt her as an auxiliary cruiser and renamed her Ural. In October she left Kronstadt to join Admiral Zinovy Rozhestvensky's fleet on its way to Vladivostok. In May 1905, Ural was used as a scout ship and was the first ship to sight Admiral Tōgō Heihachirō's fleet at the Battle of Tsushima. In an action with Japanese battleships, she was hit by a  shell in the engine room and eventually torpedoed and sunk by a Japanese destroyer.

References

Bibliography

External links 
 The Ships List – Ships Descriptions

Ships built in Stettin
1890 ships
Ships of Norddeutscher Lloyd
Rivers-class ocean liners
Ships of the Imperial Russian Navy
Russo-Japanese War naval ships of Russia
Maritime incidents in 1905
Shipwrecks of the Russo-Japanese War
Shipwrecks in the Tsushima Strait